Invención de la Santa Cruz (Spanish for Invention of the Holy Cross) is a historic Catholic parish church located in Bayamón Pueblo, the historic and administrative downtown area of Bayamón, Puerto Rico. The church is located on the Plaza de Hostos, the main town square of Bayamón, at 12 Degetau Street, in front of the former city hall and current Francisco Oller Museum building.

The establishment of the current church dates to 1750 when construction of the structure began with plans to move the main Catholic parish of the area from its former location next to Hacienda Santa Cruz to the current location, then known as Alto del Embarcadero, a small hill located close to the Bayamón River. Construction of the church was gradual and lasted for the remaining of the century with important updates being made in 1772 (the current church structure) and 1782. The consecration of the church in 1772 coincides with the official founding of the municipality of Bayamón on May 22, 1772.

The church was nominated to the National Register of Historic Places on August 8, 1984, and consequently listed on September 18, 1984.

See also 
 List of National Register of Historic Places in Puerto Rico

References 

Churches on the National Register of Historic Places in Puerto Rico
National Register of Historic Places in Bayamón, Puerto Rico
1790s establishments in Puerto Rico
Roman Catholic churches completed in 1799
1799 establishments in the Spanish Empire
Roman Catholic churches in Puerto Rico